Moinuddin Khan may refer to:
 Moinuddin Khan (musician), Indian classical instrumentalist and vocalist
 Moinuddin Khan (footballer) (born 1997), Indian footballer